David Beatty, 1st Earl Beatty (1871–1936) was a Royal Navy admiral. Admiral Beatty may also refer to:

Frank E. Beatty (1853–1926), U.S. Navy rear admiral
Frank Edmund Beatty Jr. (1894–1976), U.S. Navy vice admiral